Lada Vondrová (born 6 September 1999) is a Czech track and field athlete who specializes in sprint races. She won several Czech national titles.

Career
Vondrová competed in the women's 400 metres at the 2018 IAAF World Indoor Championships where she finished 13th in the semifinal.

At the 2019 World Athletics Championships held in Doha, Qatar, Vondrová finished the semifinals of the 400 m event in 20th place.

She competed at the 2020 Tokyo Olympics in the 400 metres, where she got a personal best of 51.14 seconds.

Achievements

Personal bests
 100 metres – 11.49 (-0.1 m/s, Ústí nad Orlicí 2022)
 200 metres – 23.28 (-1.3 m/s, Cheb 2022)
 400 metres – 51.13 (Hodonín 2022)
 400 metres indoor –  51.57 (Ostrava 2023)

National titles
 Czech Athletics Championships
 400 metres: 2019, 2022
 Czech Indoor Athletics Championships
 200 metres: 2020
 400 metres: 2019, 2020, 2021, 2022
 4 × 200 m relay: 2022

References

External links
 

1999 births
Living people
Czech female sprinters
Place of birth missing (living people)
Athletes (track and field) at the 2019 European Games
European Games medalists in athletics
European Games silver medalists for the Czech Republic
Czech Athletics Championships winners
Athletes (track and field) at the 2020 Summer Olympics
Olympic athletes of the Czech Republic
Olympic female sprinters
People from Nové Město na Moravě
Sportspeople from the Vysočina Region